Ross F. Jones (August 25, 1900 – January 25, 1979) was an American politician who was the attorney general of Arizona from 1953 to 1955.

Education and career
Jones received his LLB and masters degrees from the University of Kansas City. In 1935, he moved to Arizona with his family and settled in Tucson. He later moved to Phoenix and joined the law firm Fennemore Craig.

Jones was attorney general of Arizona from 1953 to 1955. He defeated the incumbent, Fred O. Wilson, in the 1952 election but lost his re-election bid to Robert Morrison. In 1956, Jones ran for the U.S. Senate, losing to the incumbent Carl Hayden.

Jones became a Superior Court judge in Maricopa County for ten years until his retirement in 1970 for health reasons.

He died on January 25, 1979, in Phoenix at the age of 78 after a long illness. He was buried in Greenwood Memory Lawn Cemetery.

References

1900 births
1979 deaths
Arizona Attorneys General
Arizona Republicans